Guarandita is a genus of moths belonging to the subfamily Tortricinae of the family Tortricidae. It consists of only one species, Guarandita bolivariana, which is found in Bolívar Province, Ecuador.

The wingspan is about 16 mm. The ground colour of the forewings is cream, slightly tinged ochreous ferruginous between the veins except for the costal area. The hindwings are transparent, cream white with a few greyish strigulae terminally.

Etymology
The generic name refers to the name of the town Guaranda. The specific name refers to the province of Bolivar.

See also
List of Tortricidae genera

References

Euliini
Monotypic moth genera
Taxa named by Józef Razowski
Moths of South America